Trichotropis bicarinata is a species of small sea snail, a marine gastropod mollusk in the family Capulidae, the cap snails.

Distribution

Description 

The maximum recorded shell length is 37 mm.

Habitat 
Minimum recorded depth is 10 m. Maximum recorded depth is 475 m.

References

External links

Capulidae
Gastropods described in 1825